Saint Thomas' Church is a united Protestant parish church in Dera Ismail Khan, Khyber Pakhtunkhwa, Pakistan. Now belonging to the Diocese of Peshawar of the Church of Pakistan, it was built as a Church of India, Burma and Ceylon (CIBC) parish church in 1856. When Saint Thomas' Church was a part of the CIBC, it was a part of the Diocese of Lahore.

The historic Protestant church contains memorial tablets of hundreds of soldiers of the British Indian Army who fought against the Afghans during the 1936-1939 Waziristan campaign.

For over 100 years, the compound of Saint Thomas' Church has housed more than 50 Christian families.

Tombs 
Sir Henry Marion Durand

See also 

Christianity in Pakistan
Church Missionary Society in India

References

External links 
Diocese of Peshawar, Church of Pakistan
St Thomas' Church Photograph

Church of India, Burma and Ceylon
Church of Pakistan church buildings in Pakistan
Dera Ismail Khan District
1856 establishments in British India